This is a list of peanut dishes and foods that are prepared using peanuts or peanut butter as a primary ingredient. Peanuts are also referred to as groundnuts.

Dishes and foods

 Ants on a log – a snack made by spreading peanut butter, cream cheese, ricotta cheese or any number of spreads on celery and placing raisins on top
 Bamba – a snack food prepared using liquid peanut butter as an ingredient
 Beer nuts – a generic description in Australia, of roasted, salted peanuts sold shelled but unhusked and not sweetened. In the United States, "Beer Nuts" (capitalized) is a brand of snack food building on an original product of peanuts with a "unique" sweet-and-salty glazing made to a "secret recipe".
 Boiled peanuts – a snack food in various areas of the world
 Chikki – a traditional Indian sweet generally made from peanuts and jaggery. There are several different varieties of chikki in addition to the most common groundnut chikki.
 Chocolate-coated peanut – peanuts coated in a shell of chocolate
 Citadel spread – a food paste made with peanut butter, oil, sugar and milk powder. First developed as a trail food for hikers, a Citadel Spread resembles common ready-to-use therapeutic food (RUTF) formulations, such as Plumpy'nut.
 Cracker nuts – is a snack food produced with peanuts that are coated in a wheat flour dough and then fried or deep-fried. In the Philippines, Nagaraya is the most popular brand of cracker nuts.
 Deep-fried peanuts – a snack food created by deep frying peanuts in an oil
 Garrapinyades – sugar candied peanuts flavored with vanilla, are popular snacks in Argentina, especially with kids, and Uruguay.
 Goober – a commercial product that is a combination of peanut butter and jelly in a single jar, introduced by The J.M. Smucker Company under the Smucker's brand
 Honey roasted peanuts – a popular salt, sugar and honey flavored peanut snack
 Kare-kare – a Philippine stew complemented with a thick savory peanut sauce
 Koba – a sweet made from ground peanuts, brown sugar and rice flour
 Maafe – a stew or sauce made from lamb, beef, chicken, or without meat and cooked with a sauce based on groundnuts
 Mirchi ka salan – a popular chili and peanut curry of Hyderabad, Telangana, India
 Nutter Butter – a Nabisco brand peanut-shaped sandwich cookie with a peanut butter filling
 Nutty Bars –  a snack manufactured by McKee Foods under the brand title of Little Debbie, it consists of four wafers sandwiched together in a peanut butter mixture and covered in chocolate
 P.B. Slices – a company that produced P.B. Slices brand sliced peanut butter squares, which were sold in individually wrapped slices
 Peanut brittle – a confection consisting of flat broken pieces of hard sugar candy embedded with peanuts
 Peanut butter bun – sweet bun found in Hong Kong as well as various Chinatown bakery shops
 Peanut butter – a food paste or spread made from ground dry roasted peanuts
 Peanut butter cookie – peanut butter is a principal ingredient in this cookie
 Peanut chutney – a mildly spicy chutney side dish that can be used with several snack foods and breakfast foods
 Peanut flour – made from crushed, fully or partly defatted peanuts
 Peanut oil – a mild-tasting vegetable oil derived from peanuts
 Peanut paste –  a product of peanuts and is used as an ingredient in sauces, cookies, crackers (and other baked goods), breakfast cereals and ice cream
 Peanut pie – a pie prepared with peanuts or peanut butter as a primary ingredient
 Peanut sauce –  also referred to as satay sauce, it is a sauce made from ground roasted or fried peanuts, widely used in the cuisines of Indonesia, Malaysia, Thailand, Vietnam, China, Suriname and Africa. It is used as an ingredient in various dishes.
 Gado-gado – an Indonesian salad of slightly boiled, blanched or steamed vegetables and hard-boiled eggs, fried tofu and tempeh, and lontong (rice wrapped in a banana leaf), served with a peanut sauce dressing
 Karedok – a raw vegetable salad dressed in peanut sauce from West Java, Indonesia,
 Ketoprak – a vegetarian dish from Jakarta, Indonesia that consists of tofu, vegetables, rice cake and rice vermicelli served in peanut sauce
 Llapingacho – fried potato cakes that originated in Ecuador, they are usually served with a peanut sauce
 Pecel – a traditional Javanese salad, consisting of mixed vegetables in a peanut sauce dressing
 Nasi pecel – a Javanese rice dish served with pecel
 Satay bee hoon – a dish invented by the Teochew people who immigrated to Singapore, it is a chilli-based peanut sauce very similar to the one served with satay
 Sega lengko – a typical cirebonese dish consisting of fried tempeh, fried tofu, cucumbers, bean sprouts, leaves of chives, fried onions and peanut sauce
 Peanut soup – a soup made from peanuts, often with various other ingredients
 Plumpy'nut – a peanut-based paste in a plastic wrapper for treatment of severe acute malnutrition manufactured by a French company, Nutriset.
 Rempeyek – peyek kacang, deep-fried savoury Javanese cracker made from peanuts, spices and other ingredients bound or coated by crispy flour batter.
 Scotcheroos – dessert bars prepared with chocolate, butterscotch, peanut butter, and Rice Krispies
 Smoki – snack food from Serbia, made from puffed cornmeal grits with addition of peanuts 
 Space Food Sticks – presently available in two flavors, peanut butter and chocolate, they are sold at flight museums such as the Kennedy Space Center and the Smithsonian Air & Space Museum as well as online.

Beverages
 Peanut butter whiskey – peanut-flavored whiskey
 Peanut liqueur – a liqueur produced using peanuts
 Peanut punch – a beverage popular in the Caribbean, it is made with peanut butter, milk, sugar and sometimes spices

Candies
The following candies and candy bars use peanuts as a main ingredient.

 Buckeye candy – a confection made from a peanut butter fudge partially dipped in chocolate to leave a circle of peanut butter visible
 Mary Jane – a taffy-like candy
 M&M's – varieties are produced that are filled with peanuts and peanut butter
 Peach Blossoms – a candy made by Necco that contains peanut butter wrapped in a crunchy shell
 Peanut butter cup – a molded chocolate candy with a peanut butter filling inside
 Reese's Peanut Butter Cups – a popular American candy marketed by The Hershey Company
 Potato Candy Pinwheels - a rolled confection using a combination of mashed potatoes and powdered sugar to make a dough, usually filled with peanut butter

Candy bars

 
 
 
 
 
 
 
 
 
 
 
 
 
 
 PB Max – a former candy bar
 Peanut Butter Bars – by Atkinson Candy Company
 Reese's Crispy Crunchy Bar
 Reese's Pieces
 Reese's Sticks
 Reese's Whipps
 Salted Nut Roll
 Sky Bar – produced since 1938 by Necco, it has four sections, each with a different filling: caramel, vanilla, peanut and fudge, all covered in milk chocolate
 Snickers
 Take 5
 Whatchamacallit – from 1987 to 2008, it utilized peanut butter as the flavoring agent for the crisp part of the bar
 Thingamajig – a limited edition of the Whatchamacallit bar that is no longer produced
 Zagnut

Sandwiches
 Fluffernutter – a sandwich made with peanut butter and marshmallow fluff, usually served on white bread
 Fool's Gold Loaf – a sandwich made by the Colorado Mine Company, a restaurant in Denver, Colorado. It consists of a single warmed, hollowed-out loaf of bread filled with the contents of one jar of creamy peanut butter and one jar of grape jelly, and a pound of bacon.
 Peanut butter and jelly sandwich – includes one or more layers of peanut butter and one or more layers of either jelly or jam on bread
 Candwich – a canned sandwich product, as of November 2011 it is only available in a peanut butter and jelly version
 Peanut butter, banana and bacon sandwich – sometimes referred to as an Elvis sandwich, it consists of toasted bread slices with peanut butter, sliced or mashed banana, and sometimes bacon
 Peanut butter and mayonnaise sandwich.
 Peanut butter and honey – consists of peanut butter and honey spread on either toasted or untoasted bread

See also

 List of legume dishes
 List of edible seeds

References

 
Peanut